Karl Emil Nygard, also known as Emil C. Nygard and under the pen name Ada M. Oredigger (August 25, 1906 – April 26, 1984), was an American Communist politician who became the first Communist mayor in the United States when he was elected president of the village council of Crosby, Minnesota, in 1932.

Political life
The son of Swedish-speaking immigrants from Finland, Nygard was born in Iron Belt, Wisconsin, and grew up in Crosby, Minnesota. He ran for mayor in 1930 and 1931 but lost by 250 and 48 votes, respectively. In the November 1932 general election, he ran unsuccessfully for state railroad and warehouse commissioner, polling 9,458 votes statewide. In the December 6, 1932, village election, he won the mayoralty on the Workers Ticket with 529 votes, against 359 for incumbent F. H. Kraus and 301 for Ernest B. Erickson; he was inaugurated on January 3, 1933.

Saying that he was "under the strict discipline of the Communist party", Nygard incorporated the Workers Advisory Committee into the municipal government by allowing it to pass bills before they went before the village council. On a controversial trip to New York City in 1933, he was accused of exaggerating his influence to Communist audiences and boasted of his challenges to the authority of Crosby police and businessmen. One of his acts in office was to declare May Day an official holiday. Nygard was defeated for reelection in December 1933 and made his last run in 1934.

Personal life
Nygard married Helen Koski, a Mennonite, in 1936 and they raised their family in Becker County. Though he distanced himself from the Communist Party, he reportedly remained committed to Marxism for the rest of his life. Nygard died in 1984.

References 

 

1906 births
1984 deaths
People from Becker County, Minnesota
People from Crosby, Minnesota
American people of Finnish descent
American people of Swedish descent
Members of the Communist Party USA
American Marxists
Mayors of places in Minnesota
20th-century American politicians
Communist Party USA politicians